WXCW (channel 46) is a television station licensed to Naples, Florida, United States, serving Southwest Florida as an affiliate of The CW. It is locally owned by Sun Broadcasting alongside two low-power stations: Univision/UniMás affiliate WUVF-LD (channel 2) and WANA-LD (channel 18), both also licensed to Naples. Sun Broadcasting maintains a shared services agreement (SSA) with Fort Myers Broadcasting Company, owner of Fort Myers–licensed CBS affiliate WINK-TV (channel 11), for the provision of certain services. The stations share studios on Palm Beach Boulevard (SR 80) in northeast Fort Myers, while WXCW's transmitter is located north of Fort Myers Shores, near the Charlotte–Lee county line.

History
The station first signed on the air on October 22, 1990, as WNPL-TV, which was founded and run by Chief Executive Officer William Darling of Southwest Florida Telecommunications. Originally operating as an independent station, it filled a void in the market after WFTX-TV (channel 36) joined Fox four years earlier in October 1986. The station first operated from studios located on Goodlette Road in Naples. The station was beset with problems early on, particularly concerning finding programming. Despite this, from 1993 to 1998, the station carried Florida Marlins baseball games televised by WBFS-TV in Miami before the debut of the Tampa Bay Rays, which then claimed southwest Florida as the team's territory. It also was the area's affiliate for the Orlando Magic broadcast network.

WNPL-TV filed for bankruptcy in 1993 after several lawsuits from creditors, including the Associated Press, as well as two investors who claimed that Darling made misrepresentations to them when they were told they would be part of a general partnership to operate the station. The station was finally sold two years later to Second Generation, a Cleveland-based group, in a $4 million transaction. (Darling and his wife would be found guilty of bankruptcy fraud charges for filing fraudulent claims in connection with the WNPL sale in 1996.)

Upon Second Generation's acquisition of WNPL, which had become a charter affiliate of the United Paramount Network (UPN) when that network launched on January 16, the call letters were changed to WTVK on June 30. Second Generation also relocated the station's operations to the former WEVU studios in Bonita Bay, which offered more room and easier access to satellite feeds. In 1998, Second Generation sold the station to ACME Communications, which swapped affiliations with the area's cable-only WB affiliate WSWF (later WNFM; now defunct). It then adopted the on-air moniker "WB 6", after its cable channel location in the market.

On January 24, 2006, the merger of UPN and The WB into The CW was announced. With ACME's CEO Jamie Kellner being a former WB executive, WTVK's future CW affiliation was virtually assured to be a mere formality. Indeed, on March 9, 2006, ACME affiliated all but one of their stations with the CW upon launch on September 18, 2006; WNFM was left with MyNetworkTV and did not confirm their affiliation until August.

On May 15, 2006, ACME announced that it would sell WTVK to Sun Broadcasting. The sale was completed on February 16, 2007, with the station subsequently changing its call sign to WXCW on March 2.

Newscasts
WINK-TV presently produces 27½ hours of locally produced newscasts each week for WXCW (with 4½ hours each weekday, 3½ hours on Saturdays and 1½ hours on Sundays).

As an independent station, from October 1991 to October 1992, WNPL operated a news department, producing a prime time newscast entitled Channel 46 Ten O'Clock News.

On March 26, 2007, WINK-TV (channel 11) began producing a half-hour prime time newscast for WXCW under a news share agreement. Right from the start, it emerged at a strong second place behind WFTX's longer-established and hour-long 10 p.m. newscast. On October 20, 2007, WINK-TV became the first station in Southwest Florida to begin broadcasting its local newscasts in high definition; the newscasts on WXCW were included in the upgrade. On January 7, 2008, WINK began producing a two-hour extension of its weekday morning newscast for WXCW, running from 7 to 9 a.m. The program was moved to WXCW, after WINK complied with CBS' new requirement for all of its affiliates to air its morning news program The Early Show (which was replaced by the revived CBS This Morning in January 2012) in its entirety. Originally, WINK-TV had preempted the first hour of that program due to the third hour of its weekday morning newscast, which was specifically titled as Hello Southwest Florida.

Beginning on October 31, 2008, the 10 p.m. newscast began to be presented commercial-free for the first 21 minutes of the broadcast. The 10 p.m. newscast was expanded to one hour on August 24, 2009. In the fall of 2010, WINK began producing a weekday 11 a.m. newscast on WXCW, that program has since been canceled until 2019. On September 16, 2013, the WINK-produced weekday morning newscast on the station was expanded by one hour, now running from 7:00 to 10:00 a.m.

Technical information

Subchannels
The station's digital signal is multiplexed:

On August 13, 2012, WXCW launched MundoFox (later MundoMax) on a new digital subchannel 46.2. It is also available on Comcast digital cable channel 229 in standard definition and channel 437 in high definition. Once MundoMax ceased operations on December 1, 2016, the channel began to carry Estrella TV at 720p.

Analog-to-digital conversion 
WXCW has been digital-only since February 17, 2009, which was the original date for TV stations to switch to digital, which was later pushed back to June 12, 2009.

See also
Channel 32 digital TV stations in the United States
Channel 46 virtual TV stations in the United States

References

External links

WXCW-DT2
WINK-TV website
Program Information for WXCW at TitanTV.com

The CW affiliates
Estrella TV affiliates
Television channels and stations established in 1990
1990 establishments in Florida
XCW